George Aaron (born 20 September 1963) is an Italian singer. He first came to prominence in 1984 with the release of his album She's A Devil. He released four more albums over the next five years, selling million of records worldwide. After 14 years away from the recording studio, he released a sixth album, Don't Ask me why, in 2003. As of 2009, his discography includes ten albums. He was born with the name Giorgio Aldighieri in Vicenza and is the great-grandson of opera singers Gottardo Aldighieri and Maria Spezia-Aldighieri.

Discography
1983 – Just For You
1984 – She's A Devil
1986 – New Sensations
1988 – I Heard It Through The Grapevine
1989 – Twist in My Sobriety
2003 – Don't Ask me why
2003 – Hot Love
2005 – Silly Reason
2007 – Heaven
2009 – Fear
2011 – World is Out
2011 – Russian Ladies
2012 – Love is In (feat Tiziana Rivale)
2012 – I'll never fly
2012 – NothingVille is a Town
2013 – Iza
2013 – Cuore Matto remix
2013 – Russian Ladies (radio mix)
2013 – Never cry for love
2013 – Iubesc, Amor
2013 – fever (mambo dance)
2014 – Love is in the Air (house mix)
2015 – Love is in the Air (Giorgio's Mix)
2016 – A Star in the Sky
2016 – White Christmas
2015 – If I get home on Christmas day

Featurings
1983 – Somebody (VIDEO)
1984 – Don't Stop (TIME)
1984 – Selling Song (TIME)
1984 – Sympathy for the devil (TIME)
1984 – Silent Smiles (RAM BAND)
1895 – Paradiso Land (PARADISO)
1985 – Sahara Sand (OTTOMIX) 
1986 – We are the Video (VIDEO)
1987 – Jesahell 
1987 – Robin Hood (WILLIAM KING)
2012 – The End with Andrea DP dj
2015 – Let it be me with Angelo Seretti

Album
1983 – Memories on Mix
1997 – George Aaron Complete
2001 – The lost Album
2008 – George Aaron
2008 – Summer Collection 2008
2013 – One step further (compilation)
2013 – From George in Vicenza

References

External links
Official website of George Aaron

1963 births
Living people
Italian male singers
Italian Italo disco musicians